Bennetto Payne (born December 10, 1909 – February 7, 1987) was a Mexican professional boxer.

Professional career
In January 1930, Payne beat Ad Kuhlow via a unanimous decision over eight rounds.

References

External links

Boxers from Yucatán (state)
Light-heavyweight boxers
1909 births
1987 deaths
Mexican male boxers